John William Buzhardt (August 17, 1936 – June 15, 2008) was an American professional baseball right-handed pitcher, who played in Major League Baseball (MLB) for the Chicago Cubs, Philadelphia Phillies, Chicago White Sox, Baltimore Orioles and Houston Astros from  through .

Career
Buzahrdt's 15-year pro career began in the Cubs' farm system in 1954.

His best MLB season came while pitching for the  White Sox, when he won 13 games and lost eight. Buzhardt's career win–loss record was 71–96 and he had a 3.66 earned run average (ERA). The ,  Buzhardt appeared in 326 MLB games, 200 as a starting pitcher, with 44 complete games and 15 shutouts; in 1,490 innings pitched, he struck out 678, allowing 1,425 hits and 457 bases on balls.

On June 21, 1959, while pitching for the Cubs, Buzhardt pitched a 4–0 one-hitter against the Phillies, allowing only a third-inning single by Carl Sawatski, and facing just 28 batters (one over the minimum). On July 28, 1961, in the second game of a doubleheader at Connie Mack Stadium, he pitched a complete game, 3–2 victory over the San Francisco Giants. The Phillies then lost their next 23 games, setting a modern-day major league record for consecutive losses. They finally won a game on August 20, with Buzhardt pitching another complete game, defeating the Milwaukee Braves 7–4, at Milwaukee County Stadium, also in the second game of a doubleheader.

Later life
After his baseball career, he returned to his native Prosperity, South Carolina, working as a foreman for the Kodak Company. Buzhardt died in Prosperity on June 15, 2008, at the age of 71.

References

External links

John Buzhardt at SABR (Baseball BioProject)
John Buzhardt at Astros Daily
John Buzhardt at The Deadball Era

1936 births
2008 deaths
American expatriate baseball players in Cuba
Baltimore Orioles players
Baseball players from South Carolina
Chicago Cubs players
Chicago White Sox players
Des Moines Bruins players
Gainesville Owls players
Habana players
Hickory Rebels players
Houston Astros players
Magic Valley Cowboys players
Major League Baseball pitchers
Memphis Chickasaws players
Paris Lakers players
People from Prosperity, South Carolina
Philadelphia Phillies players
Portland Beavers players